Brian Kelleher (born August 19, 1986) is an American professional mixed martial artist. Kelleher currently competes in the Bantamweight division for the Ultimate Fighting Championship (UFC). A professional competitor since 2011, Kelleher has also competed for Bellator and CES MMA.

Background
Kelleher was born on August 19, 1986, in Selden, New York, the son of Matt and Jen Kelleher. Kelleher has an older brother Keith and a younger brother Mak who is also a professional mixed martial artist. Kelleher competed in a variety of sports from a young age including ice hockey, soccer and bowling. He later began combat sport training in 2007.

Mixed martial arts career

Ultimate Fighting Championship
Kelleher made his promotional debut against Iuri Alcântara on short notice at UFC 212 on June 3, 2017. He won the fight via submission due to a guillotine choke in the first round and was awarded a Performance of the Night bonus.

Kelleher next faced Marlon Vera on July 22, 2017 at UFC on Fox 25. He lost the fight via armbar submission in the first round.

Kelleher faced Damian Stasiak on October 21, 2017 at UFC Fight Night 118. He won the fight via technical knockout in the third round. This win earned him the Fight of the Night award.

Kelleher faced Renan Barão on February 24, 2018 at UFC on Fox 28. He won the fight by unanimous decision.

Kelleher faced John Lineker on May 12, 2018 at UFC 224. He lost the fight via knockout in the third round.

Kelleher was originally scheduled to face Domingo Pilarte on November 3, 2018 at UFC 230. Pilarte was forced to withdraw from the bout, citing an injury, and Kelleher is now slated to face Montel Jackson. At the weigh-ins, Kelleher weight at 137 pounds, 1 pound over the bantamweight non-title fight limit of 136.  He was fined 20 percent of his purse, which went to his opponent Jackson. On November 3, it was reported that Kelleher withdrew from the bout due to illness and thus the fight was cancelled. The pairing was left intact and rescheduled for December 29, 2018 at UFC 232. At the weigh-ins, Jackson weighed in at 137 lbs, 1 pound over the non-title fight bantamweight limit of 136 lbs. Jackson was fined 20 percent of his purse to Kelleher and the fight proceeded at catchweight. Kelleher lost the fight via submission in the first round.

Kelleher was scheduled to face Mitch Gagnon on May 4, 2019 at UFC Fight Night 150. However, Kelleher pulled out of the fight on April 10, citing an injury, and he was replaced by promotional newcomer Cole Smith.

As the last fight of his prevailing contract, Kelleher faced Ode' Osbourne at UFC 246 on January 18, 2020. He won the fight via a submission in the first round. This win earned him a Performance of the Night award.

After negotiating a new contract, Kelleher faced Hunter Azure in a featherweight contest on May 13, 2020 at UFC Fight Night: Smith vs. Teixeira. He won the fight via knockout in round two.

Kelleher faced Cody Stamann on June 6, 2020 at UFC 250. He lost the bout via unanimous decision.

Kelleher was scheduled to face Ricky Simón on September 5, 2020 at UFC Fight Night 176. However, Simón's cornerman tested positive for COVID-19 and he was forced to withdraw from the event, and he was replaced by promotional newcomer Kevin Natividad. In turn, Natividad was pulled from the matchup on the day of the event due to undisclosed reasons, and he was replaced by fellow newcomer Ray Rodriguez, who weighed in as a backup. Kelleher won the fight via a guillotine choke in round one. This win earned him a Performance of the Night award.

The bout against Simón was rescheduled on January 16, 2021 at UFC on ABC 1.  However, Kelleher also tested positive on January 1 and was pulled from the bout. He was replaced by newcomer Gaetano Pirello and the bout will take place four days later at UFC on ESPN: Chiesa vs. Magny.

The bout between Kelleher and Ricky Simón was rebooked for the third time and took place at UFC 258 on February 13, 2021. Kelleher lost the fight via unanimous decision.

Kelleher faced Domingo Pilarte on August 21, 2021 at UFC on ESPN: Cannonier vs. Gastelum. He won the fight via unanimous decision.

Kelleher was scheduled to face Saidyokub Kakhramonov on January 15, 2022 at UFC on ESPN 32. However, Kakhramonov withdrew from the bout for undisclosed reason and he was replaced by Kevin Croom. He won the fight via unanimous decision after knocking Croom down once in the first round.

As the first bout of his new four-fight contract, Kelleher faced Umar Nurmagomedov on March 5, 2022 at UFC 272. He lost the fight via a rear naked choke in round one.

Kelleher faced Mario Bautista on June 25, 2022, at UFC on ESPN 38. He lost the fight via a rear-naked choke submission in the first round.

Kellehervs is scheduled to face Journey Newson on April 29, 2023 at UFC Fight Night 223.

Championships and accomplishments
Ultimate Fighting Championship
Performance of the Night (Three times) 
Fight of the Night (Two times) ,
Ring of Combat
Bantamweight Championship (One time; former)
One successful title defense

Mixed martial arts record

|-
|Loss
|align=center|24–14
|Mario Bautista
|Submission (rear-naked choke)
|UFC on ESPN: Tsarukyan vs. Gamrot
|
|align=center|1
|align=center|2:27
|Las Vegas, Nevada, United States
|
|-
|Loss
|align=center|24–13
|Umar Nurmagomedov
|Submission (rear-naked choke)
|UFC 272
|
|align=center|1
|align=center|3:15
|Las Vegas, Nevada, United States
|
|-
|Win
|align=center|24–12
|Kevin Croom
|Decision (unanimous)
|UFC on ESPN: Kattar vs. Chikadze
|
|align=center|3
|align=center|5:00
|Las Vegas, Nevada, United States
|
|-
|Win
|align=center|23–12
|Domingo Pilarte
|Decision (unanimous)
|UFC on ESPN: Cannonier vs. Gastelum
|
|align=center|3
|align=center|5:00
|Las Vegas, Nevada, United States
|
|-
|Loss
|align=center|22–12
|Ricky Simón
|Decision (unanimous)
|UFC 258
|
|align=center|3
|align=center|5:00
|Las Vegas, Nevada, United States
|
|-
|Win
|align=center|22–11
|Ray Rodriguez
|Submission (guillotine choke)
|UFC Fight Night: Overeem vs. Sakai
|
|align=center|1
|align=center|0:39
|Las Vegas, Nevada, United States
| 
|-
|Loss
|align=center|21–11
|Cody Stamann
|Decision (unanimous)
|UFC 250
|
|align=center|3
|align=center|5:00
|Las Vegas, Nevada, United States
|
|-
|Win
|align=center|21–10
|Hunter Azure
|KO (punches)
|UFC Fight Night: Smith vs. Teixeira
|
|align=center|2
|align=center|3:40
|Jacksonville, Florida, United States
|
|-
|Win
|align=center|20–10
|Ode' Osbourne
|Submission (guillotine choke)
|UFC 246 
|
|align=center|1
|align=center|2:49
|Las Vegas, Nevada, United States
| 
|-
|Loss
|align=center|19–10
|Montel Jackson
|Submission (D'Arce choke)
|UFC 232 
|
|align=center|1
|align=center|1:40
|Inglewood, California, United States
|
|-
|Loss
|align=center|19–9
|John Lineker
|KO (punch)
|UFC 224
|
|align=center|3
|align=center|3:43
|Rio de Janeiro, Brazil
|
|-
|Win
|align=center|19–8
|Renan Barão
|Decision (unanimous)
|UFC on Fox: Emmett vs. Stephens
|
|align=center|3
|align=center|5:00
|Orlando, Florida, United States
|
|-
|Win
|align=center|18–8
|Damian Stasiak
|TKO (punches)
|UFC Fight Night: Cerrone vs. Till
|
|align=center|3
|align=center|3:39
|Gdańsk, Poland
|
|-
|Loss
|align=center|17–8
|Marlon Vera
|Submission (armbar)
|UFC on Fox: Weidman vs. Gastelum
|
|align=center|1
|align=center|2:18
|Uniondale, New York, United States
|
|-
|Win
|align=center|17–7
|Iuri Alcântara
|Submission (guillotine choke)
|UFC 212
|
|align=center|1
|align=center|1:48
|Rio de Janeiro, Brazil
|
|-
|Win
|align=center|16–7
|Julio Arce
|Submission (guillotine choke)
|Ring of Combat 54
|
|align=center|3
|align=center|0:18
|Atlantic City, New Jersey, United States
|
|-
| Win
| align=center| 15–7
| Josh Robinson
| KO (spinning back fist)
| Ring of Combat 53
| 
| align=center| 3
| align=center| 0:24
| Atlantic City, New Jersey, United States
|
|-
| Win
| align=center| 14–7
| Julio Arce
| Decision (majority)
| Ring of Combat 52
| 
| align=center| 3
| align=center| 5:00
| Atlantic City, New Jersey, United States
|
|-
| Win
| align=center| 13–7
| Jay Haas
| Submission (guillotine choke)
| CCFC 49
| 
| align=center| 1
| align=center| 4:49
| Bethlehem, Pennsylvania, United States
|
|-
| Win
| align=center| 12–7
| Andre Soukhamthath
| Decision (unanimous)
| CES MMA 28
| 
| align=center| 3
| align=center| 5:00
| Lincoln, Rhode Island, United States
|
|-
| Win
| align=center| 11–7
| Mark Cherico
| Submission (guillotine choke)
| Pinnacle FC 9
| 
| align=center| 1
| align=center| 0:37
| Canonsburg, Pennsylvania, United States
|
|-
| Loss
| align=center| 10–7
| Andy Main
| Submission (triangle choke)
| CCFC 34
| 
| align=center| 1
| align=center| 1:26
| Morristown, New Jersey, United States
|
|-
| Win
| align=center| 10–6
| Lester Caslow
| Submission (rear-naked choke)
| CCFC 31
| 
| align=center| 2
| align=center| 1:34
| Atlantic City, New Jersey, United States
|
|-
| Loss
| align=center| 9–6
| Jeff Smith
| Submission (armbar)
| CCFC 29
| 
| align=center| 2
| align=center| 4:39
| King of Prussia, Pennsylvania, United States
|
|-
| Loss
| align=center| 9–5
| Scott Heckman
| Decision (unanimous)
| CCFC 27
| 
| align=center| 3
| align=center| 5:00
| King of Prussia, Pennsylvania, United States
|
|-
| Loss
| align=center| 9–4
| Jimmie Rivera
| Decision (unanimous)
| Bellator 95
| 
| align=center| 3
| align=center| 5:00
| Atlantic City, New Jersey, United States
|
|-
| Win
| align=center| 9–3
| Tyler Kahihikolo
| Decision (unanimous)
| Coalition of Combat
| 
| align=center| 3
| align=center| 5:00
| Phoenix, Arizona, United States
|
|-
| Win
| align=center| 8–3
| Bill Jones
| KO (punch)
| WCMMA 1: Portugal vs. USA
| 
| align=center| 1
| align=center| 0:10
| Ledyard, Connecticut, United States
|
|-
| Win
| align=center| 7–3
| Ryan Vaccaro
| TKO (flying knee)
| Rock Out Knock Out
| 
| align=center| 2
| align=center| 0:56
| Asbury Park, New Jersey, United States
|
|-
| Win
| align=center| 6–3
| Raphael Chavez
| TKO (punches)
| CCFC 14
| 
| align=center| 2
| align=center| 3:41
| Atlantic City, New Jersey, United States
|
|-
| Win
| align=center| 5–3
| Josh Parker
| Submission (rear-naked choke)
| NEF: Fight Night 1
| 
| align=center| 1
| align=center| 4:31
| Lewiston, Maine, United States
|
|-
| Loss
| align=center| 4–3
| Artur Rofi
| Submission (armbar)
| CCFC 12
| 
| align=center| 1
| align=center| 4:57
| Atlantic City, New Jersey, United States
|
|-
| Loss
| align=center| 4–2
| Claudio Ledesma
| Decision (unanimous)
| Bellator 54
| 
| align=center| 3
| align=center| 5:00
| Atlantic City, New Jersey, United States
|
|-
| Win
| align=center| 4–1
| Michael LaDuke
| TKO (doctor stoppage)
| Ring of Combat 37
| 
| align=center| 3
| align=center| 3:14
| Atlantic City, New Jersey, United States
|
|-
| Win
| align=center| 3–1
| Manny Millan
| Submission (rear-naked choke)
| Xtreme Fight Events: Cage Wars 9
| 
| align=center| 1
| align=center| 3:34
| Atlantic City, New Jersey, United States
|
|-
| Win
| align=center| 2–1
| Siyam Yousefi
| Submission (guillotine choke)
| CCFC 8
| 
| align=center| 1
| align=center| 2:41
| Atlantic City, New Jersey, United States
|
|-
| Win
| align=center| 1–1
| Nate Ainsworth
| KO (punch)
| CZ 37
| 
| align=center| 1
| align=center| 0:23
| Salem, New Hampshire, United States
|
|-
| Loss
| align=center| 0–1
| Dan Cion
| Submission (guillotine choke)
| Xtreme Fight Events: Cage Wars 5
| 
| align=center| 1
| align=center| 4:42
| Chester, Pennsylvania, United States
|

See also
 List of current UFC fighters
 List of male mixed martial artists

References

External links
 
 

American male mixed martial artists
Bantamweight mixed martial artists
Featherweight mixed martial artists
Mixed martial artists utilizing Brazilian jiu-jitsu
Mixed martial artists from New York (state)
Living people
1986 births
American practitioners of Brazilian jiu-jitsu
People from Oceanside, New York
Ultimate Fighting Championship male fighters